The 2010 Finlandia Trophy was the 15th edition of an annual senior-level international figure skating competition held in Finland. It was held at the Valtti Areena in Vantaa between October 8 and 10, 2010. Skaters competed in the disciplines of men's singles, ladies' singles, and ice dancing.

Schedule
(UTC+2)

Results

Men

Ladies

Ice dancing

External links
 2010 Finlandia Trophy results
 Photos of Finlandia Trophy 2010
 announcement
 official website

2010
Finlandia Trophy
Finlandia Trophy